Cochecton Presbyterian Church is a historic Presbyterian church on Co. Rd. 114, E of Delaware R. Bridge in Cochecton, Sullivan County, New York, United States.  It was built in 1903 and is a cross gabled, wood-frame structure featuring a corner bell tower.  The interior is designed on the Akron Plan.

It was added to the National Register of Historic Places in 1992.

References

Presbyterian churches in New York (state)
Churches on the National Register of Historic Places in New York (state)
Churches completed in 1903
20th-century Presbyterian church buildings in the United States
Churches in Sullivan County, New York
Akron Plan church buildings
National Register of Historic Places in Sullivan County, New York
1903 establishments in New York (state)